Slovenia was represented by Darja Švajger with the song "Prisluhni mi" in the Eurovision Song Contest 1995.

Before Eurovision

Slovenski izbor za pesem Evrovizije 1995 
Slovenski izbor za pesem Evrovizije 1995 took place on 18 February 1995 at the RTV Slovenija studios in Ljubljana, hosted by Saša Gerdej. A jury vote from twelve radio stations in Slovenia determined the winner.

At Eurovision
On the night of the contest, Darja Švajger performed 20th in the running order, following Denmark and preceding Israel. At the close of voting she received 84 points, placing 7th in a field of 23. This was, and still is as of 2022, Slovenia's joint-best placing at the contest, shared with 2001 Slovenian entry, "Energy", performed by Nuša Derenda.

The Slovene jury awarded its 12 points to Croatia.

Voting

References

1995
Countries in the Eurovision Song Contest 1995
Eurovision